Kenneth Walton may refer to:

 Kenneth Walton (pathologist) (1919–2008), British experimental pathologist and rheumatologist
 Kenneth Walton (geographer) (1923–1979), British geographer, vice principal of Aberdeen University